Red Storm Rising is a war novel, written by Tom Clancy and co-written with Larry Bond, and released on August 7, 1986. Set in the mid-1980s, it features a Third World War between the North Atlantic Treaty Organization and Warsaw Pact forces, and is unique for depicting the conflict as being fought exclusively with conventional weapons, rather than escalating to the use of weapons of mass destruction or nuclear warfare. It is one of two Clancy novels, along with SSN (1996), that are not set in the Ryanverse.

The book debuted at number one on the New York Times bestseller list. It eventually lent its name to game development company Red Storm Entertainment, which Clancy co-founded in 1997.

Plot
Militants from Soviet Azerbaijan destroy an oil production refinery in Nizhnevartovsk, threatening to cripple the Soviet Union's economy due to oil shortages. After much deliberation, the Soviet Politburo decides to seize the Persian Gulf by military force in order to recoup the country's oil losses. Knowing that the United States had pledged to defend the oil-producing countries in the Persian Gulf, the Soviets decide that neutralizing NATO is a necessary first step before its military operation can take place. If West Germany were to be neutralized and occupied, the Soviets believe that the United States would not move to rescue the Arab states since it could meet its oil needs from the Western Hemisphere alone.

To divert attention from the impending operation, the Politburo embarks upon an elaborate maskirovka to disguise both their predicament and their intentions. The Soviets publicly declare their arms reduction proposal to scrap their obsolete nuclear missile submarines. The KGB then carries out a false flag operation involving a bomb being detonated in a Kremlin building, framing a KGB sleeper agent as a West German intelligence spy involved in the incident. The Politburo publicly denounces the West German government and calls for retaliation.

Even though a planned attack on a NATO communications facility in Lammersdorf was compromised when a Spetsnaz officer was arrested, the Soviet Army pushes through with their advance operations in Germany. They suffer reverses on the first night of the war, however, when NATO stealth and fighter-bomber aircraft achieve air superiority over Central Europe by eliminating Soviet fighter and AEW&C aircraft, and destroying key bridges that much of the Soviet Army has yet to cross.

Nevertheless, the Soviet Navy achieves a decisive early victory against a combined U.S. Navy carrier battle group consisting of the USS Nimitz, USS Saratoga, the French carrier Foch and the USS Saipan, and their escorts resulting in the Foch and Saipan being sunk, while Nimitz is forced to spend weeks in drydock undergoing repairs. This allows a Soviet amphibious assault with a follow-on airlift to successfully occupy Iceland, taking control of the NATO airbase in Keflavík, ensuring command of the strategically important GIUK gap. A U.S. Air Force lieutenant, Mike Edwards, escapes the attack with a squad of U.S. Marines, and hides out in the countryside, observing the Soviet flight operations and arrival of MiG-29s at Keflavik, and serving as a scout for NATO forces operating from Scotland, given the call-sign "Beagle" after his bonafides were verified. The Soviets also occupy northern Norway, bringing NATO radar and air stations in Scotland within range of sustained air attack by Long Range Aviation.

NATO and Soviet air and ground forces battle ferociously in Germany, with both sides taking heavy losses. General-Colonel Pavel Alekseyev, the de-facto Soviet senior commander on the ground, scores a breakthrough in a tank battle at Alfeld, opening the possibility of a Soviet advance beyond the Weser River with far less opposition from NATO forces. Meanwhile, a naval attack on Soviet bomber bases with cruise missiles launched by NATO submarines paves the way for an amphibious assault on Iceland, retaking the island and effectively closing the Atlantic to Soviet forces. While Edwards is first reinforced by a squad of Royal Marines and then rescued by the U.S. Marines, a Soviet prisoner captured during the retaking of Iceland reveals the true cause of the war, and a NATO air offensive swiftly destroys much of the Soviet military's readily-available fuel supplies.

With Iceland re-taken, the United States is able to resupply the rest of NATO via the reopened sea lanes. By this point Soviet tank and strategic bomber formations have taken punishing losses, forcing them to further cede the initiative as NATO prepares to mount a decisive counteroffensive. The Soviet leadership begins to realize that they face the possibility of outright defeat -- either through a NATO military breakthrough or a war of attrition which, given their desperate lack of oil supplies, would amount to the same result. The General Secretary considers using nuclear weapons to force a favorable end to the war. This infuriates Alekseyev, who had been mobilizing for a final counterattack on Germany but faces execution by the Soviet government for its slow timetable. The KGB chief organizes a coup along with Alekseyev and other members of the Politburo. The new Soviet government then negotiates for a ceasefire with NATO and a return to status quo ante bellum, ending the war.

Characters

NATO
 Robert A. Toland III: NSA analyst and naval reservist, later promoted to commander in the United States Navy Reserve.
 Michael D. Edwards, Jr.: First lieutenant in the United States Air Force serving as a meteorological officer at Naval Air Station Keflavik in Iceland. Leads intelligence gathering there during the Soviet occupation of the island with the code name of "Beagle", later receiving a Navy Cross for his bravery.
 Jerry "The Hammer" O'Malley: Lieutenant Commander in the USN serving as a helicopter pilot aboard Reuben James. Receives a Distinguished Flying Cross for his antisubmarine warfare work.
 Amelia "Buns" Nakamura: F-15C pilot for the USAF who becomes the first American female fighter ace by shooting down three Tu-16 Badger bombers while on ferry duty and later using ASM-135 anti-satellite missiles to destroy at least two Soviet naval radar reconnaissance satellites. She also becomes the first Space Ace because of her satellite shoot-downs.
 Terry Mackall: Sergeant First Class in the United States Army serving as an M1 Abrams tank commander in the 11th Armored Cavalry Regiment on the German front. Receives a battlefield promotion to lieutenant for his valor and leadership skills.
 Colonel Douglas "Duke" Ellington: USAF officer and commander of the F-19 Stealth squadron
 Colonel Charles DeWinter "Chuck" Lowe: Officer in the United States Marine Corps who works with Bob Toland before the conflict and later as the commanding officer of a Marine regiment in the invasion force that recaptured Iceland. Lowe served three Tours of duty in Vietnam and received a Navy Cross for his bravery in that war.
 General Eugene Robinson: Supreme Allied Commander Europe. Robinson served three Tours of duty in Vietnam and commanded the 101st Airborne Division.
 William Calloway: British Reuters correspondent and SIS agent.
 James Smith: Sergeant in the United States Marine Corps serving under lieutenant Edwards in Iceland.

Soviet Union
 Pavel Leonidovich Alekseyev: Deputy Commander of the Southwest Front and then Commander in Chief-Western Theater after briefly serving as second in command. After the coup, he is made Deputy Minister of Defense and Chief of the General Staff of the Soviet Armed Forces.
 Mikhail Eduardovich Sergetov: Energy Minister and non-voting member of the Soviet Politburo. After the coup, he becomes acting General Secretary.
 Ivan Mikhailovich Sergetov: Alekseyev's aide-de-camp and Sergetov's son. Promoted to major during the war.
 Major Arkady Semyonovich Sorokin: Soviet VDV officer whose daughter Svetlana dies in the Kremlin bombing. Later recruited by Alekseyev for the coup.
 Boris Georgiyevich Kosov: Chairman of the Committee for State Security (KGB). Mastermind of the coup, only to be killed in revenge by Major Sorokin.
 Marshal Andre Shavyrin: Chief of the General Staff. Later executed by the Politburo for failing to bring favorable results on the war.
 Marshal Yuri Rozhkov: Commander-in-Chief of the Soviet Army. Executed along with Marshal Shavyrin.
 Marshal Fiodr Borrissovitch Boukharin: Commander of the Kiev Military District. Later promoted to the head of the General Staff after Shavyrin and Rozhkov's execution, then forced into retirement after Alekseyev's Coup.
 Andre Illich Chernyavin: Spetsnaz officer assigned to sabotage the NATO command post at Lammersdorf.

Other characters
 Vigdis Agustdottir: Icelandic civilian rescued by Edwards from Soviet soldiers in Iceland
 Patrick Flynn: Associated Press Moscow Bureau chief
 Ibrahim Tolkaze: Militant Islamist of Azerbaijani descent working as an oil field engineer. He and his confederates Rasul and Mohammet instigate the road to war by infiltrating the oil refinery where Ibrahim works, murdering multiple technicians and triggering numerous pipe ruptures that set the entire refinery and adjacent oil field ablaze. All of them are killed when security forces storm the control room.
 Gerhardt Falken: Alleged West German Federal Intelligence Service agent behind the Kremlin bombing.

Themes

Red Storm Rising depicts a future Third World War, chiefly between the United States and the Soviet Union. It follows the "future war" genre first popularized by the 1871 novella The Battle of Dorking by George Tomkyns Chesney as well as the science fiction novel The War in the Air (1908) by H.G. Wells. Red Storm Rising is unusual among Cold War examples of the genre in that it presented a war fought entirely using conventional weapons rather than one with nuclear weaponry or chemical weaponry. For instance, The Third World War: August 1985 describes a conflict based on fairly similar assumptions, but involving heavy use of chemical weaponry and with limited use of strategic nuclear weapons at the conclusion of the conflict.  

According to a document released by the UK National Archives in December 2015, U.S. President Ronald Reagan had recommended Red Storm Rising to UK Prime Minister Margaret Thatcher shortly after the Reykjavík Summit in 1986 between him and Soviet general secretary Mikhail Gorbachev so as to gain an understanding of the Soviet Union's intentions and strategy. Some of the advanced weapons systems described in the novel were deployed four years later in the Gulf War.

Development
Tom Clancy met Larry Bond in 1982. Clancy had purchased Bond's wargame Harpoon as a primary source for his future novel The Hunt for Red October (1984). They used the board game's second edition miniature rules to test key battle sequences, notably the Soviet operation to seize Iceland and the attack on the carrier battle group in the "Dance of the Vampires" chapter, with Bond refereeing the game sessions, which typically involved several players on each side (Clancy among them) acting in various roles. The two discussed Convoy-84, a wargame Bond had been working on at the time that featured a new Battle of the North Atlantic. The idea became the basis for Red Storm Rising. "We plotted out the book together, then, while I researched the military issues, Tom wrote the book," Bond said. "I'm listed as co-author, but I wrote like 1 percent of the book," Bond stated in a 2013 interview. For research on the Politburo scenes, Clancy and Bond interviewed Soviet defector Arkady Shevchenko.

Publication

In 1987, the book was published in French as Tempête Rouge (Red Storm), translated by France-Marie Watkins, with the collaboration of Jean Sabbagh.

Reception
Like its predecessor, The Hunt for Red October, the book received critical acclaim for its accurate military narrative. Publishers Weekly praised it as "fascinating and totally credible story, told with authenticity and great suspense". Kirkus Reviews hailed it as "an informative, readable, sometimes dazzling speculation on superpower war".

Game adaptations
In December 1988, MicroProse released a Red Storm Rising computer game, in which the player commanded an American submarine against Soviet forces. The player had the option of choosing between both single missions or campaign and which era to play in; modern missions offered the player more advanced submarines and weapons, but also a more technologically advanced adversary as well.

In 1989, TSR, Inc. released the Red Storm Rising board game designed by Douglas Niles, based on the book. The game won the Origins Award for Best Modern-Day Boardgame and Best Graphic Presentation of a Boardgame in 1989.

See also
 The Third World War: The Untold Story, by John Hackett
 Red Army, by Ralph Peters

Notes

References

Further reading

 Gallagher, Mark. Action figures: Men, action films, and contemporary adventure narratives (Springer, 2006).
 Griffin, Benjamin. "The good guys win: Ronald Reagan, Tom Clancy, and the transformation of national security" (MA thesis, U of Texas, 2015).  online
 Hixson, Walter L. "Red Storm Rising: Tom Clancy Novels and the Cult of National Security." Diplomatic History 17.4 (1993): 599–614. 
 Outlaw, Leroy B. "Red Storm Rising-A Primer for a Future Conventional War in Central Europe"" (Army War College, 1988). online
 Payne, Matthew Thomas. Playing war: Military video games after 9/11 (NYU Press, 2016).
 Terdoslavich, William. The Jack Ryan Agenda: Policy and Politics in the Novels of Tom Clancy: An Unauthorized Analysis (Macmillan, 2005). excerpt

External links

1986 American novels
American thriller novels
American war novels
American speculative fiction novels
Novels set during the Cold War
Novels about submarine warfare
Novels about terrorism
Novels by Tom Clancy
Novels set in the Atlantic Ocean
Novels set in Germany
Novels set in Iceland
Novels set in Moscow
Novels set in Scotland
Novels set in Siberia
Novels set in the Soviet Union
Novels set during World War III
Soviet Union war fiction
Techno-thriller novels
Novels about space warfare
Works about the United States Navy
Novels about the United States Marine Corps
Military of the United States in fiction
G. P. Putnam's Sons books